Eichstedt is a municipality in the district of Stendal, in Saxony-Anhalt, Germany. On 1 January 2010 it absorbed the former municipalities Baben and Lindtorf.

References

Municipalities in Saxony-Anhalt
Stendal (district)